Siobhán Nicholson (born 11 June 1966) is an Irish former professional tennis player.

Biography
Nicholson, a London-born player of Irish parentage, represented the Ireland Federation Cup team from 1983 to 1993. She featured in a total of 28 ties for Ireland, winning 10 singles and 12 doubles rubbers.

While competing on the professional tour, Nicholson reached a career best singles ranking of 259 in the world, which was at the time the highest ever ranking attained by an Irish woman player.

Nicholson played college tennis in the United States for the University of Florida, where she earned All-American honours for singles in both 1988 and 1989.

ITF finals

Singles: 5 (3–2)

Doubles: 6 (4–2)

References

External links
 
 
 

1966 births
Living people
Irish female tennis players
Florida Gators women's tennis players
English people of Irish descent